Benoor /b ae n u: r/ is a  small village located at Kasaragod district of Kerala state India.

Etymology
Popularly known as Benoor Perumbala.

Location
Perumbala is the nearby village and benoor is a part of that village.

Nearest paces ° Deli 1.1 km      
  Paravanadukkam 1 km
                        ° Koliyadukkam 1 km
                         °Perumbala 1.5 km.

Located 5 km away from Kasaragod town.

Administration
Part of Chemnad Gramapanchayath, Kasaragod district panchayath, Udma legislative assembly, Chengala legislative division.

Demography
Majority of residents of Benoor belongs to Muslim, Hindu religion.

Temples 
 Rifayiya Juma Masjid, Benoor
 Venoor temple, Benoor

Sub places at benoor include Kakkandam, Kundadukkam & Maanthotty.

Commonly spoke language is Malayalam

Covers about 5 km.sq of Chemnad gramapanchayath

Youth clubs include Bhagathsingh Youth Club Benoor, AKG library Kundadukkam, Jannath Ben Street.
benoor

Transportation

Nearest Railway station is Kalanad [do have stop only for passenger trains]

The major railway station is Kasaragod.

Nearest airport is at Mangalore known asBajpe/ Managalore (IXE) international Airport.

Kerala state road transport corporation ( K S R T C ) bus is the only bus transportation covering benoor which have stops at kappana [750m] and kundadukkam[200m]. Private bus service is not available

Villages in Kasaragod district

References